Lype is a genus of net tube caddisflies in the family Psychomyiidae. There are more than 20 described species in Lype.

Species
These 22 species belong to the genus Lype:

 Lype afra Mosely, 1939
 Lype atnia Malicky & Chantaramongkol, 1993
 Lype auripilis McLachlan, 1884
 Lype daurica Ivanov & Levanidova in Arefina, Ivanov & Levanidova, 1996
 Lype dhumravarna Schmid, 1972
 Lype diversa (Banks, 1914)
 Lype excisa Mey, 1991
 Lype flavospinosa Mosely, 1930
 Lype formosana
 Lype lubaretsi
 Lype nitida Statzner, 1976
 Lype phaeopa (Stephens, 1836)
 Lype reducta (Hagen, 1868)
 Lype saxonica Mey, 1985
 Lype sinuata McLachlan, 1878
 Lype tipmanee Chantaramongkol & Malicky, 1986
 Lype vietnamella Mey, 1996
 † Lype essentia Melnitsky & Ivanov, 2013
 † Lype eximia Ulmer, 1912
 † Lype prolongata Ulmer, 1912
 † Lype recta Mey, 1988
 † Psychomyia sericea (Pictet & Hagen, 1856)

References

Further reading

 
 
 

Trichoptera genera
Articles created by Qbugbot